The eotaxins are a CC chemokine subfamily of eosinophil chemotactic proteins.

In humans, there are three family members:
 CCL11 (eotaxin-1)
 CCL24 (eotaxin-2)
 CCL26 (eotaxin-3)

References 

Protein families